Gastón Luciano Ávila (born 30 September 2001) is an Argentine professional footballer who plays as a defender for Belgian First Division A club Antwerp.

Club career

Boca Juniors
On 2 January 2019, Ávila was signed by Boca Juniors. Ávila made his professional debut with Boca Juniors in a 2-1 Argentine Primera División win over Talleres on 2 February 2020.

Loan to Rosario Central
On 10 February 2021, Ávila moved to Rosario Central, on a loan deal until the end of the season.

Antwerp
On 23 July 2022, Avila signed for Belgian First Division A club Antwerp for a fee of €4.40 million.

Personal life
Ávila is the brother of the footballer Chimy Ávila.

Honours
Boca Juniors
Argentine Primera División: 2019–20
Copa de la Liga Profesional: 2022

References

External links
 

2001 births
Living people
Footballers from Rosario, Santa Fe
Argentine footballers
Association football defenders
Boca Juniors footballers
Rosario Central footballers
Royal Antwerp F.C. players
Argentine Primera División players
Belgian Pro League players
Argentine expatriate footballers
Expatriate footballers in Belgium
Argentine expatriate sportspeople in Belgium